Leptosarcus is a genus of beetles in the family Carabidae, containing the following species:

 Leptosarcus hessei Basilewsky, 1954
 Leptosarcus porrectus (Peringuey, 1892)

References

Lebiinae